Peru–Spain relations are foreign relations between Peru and Spain. Both nations are members of the Association of Academies of the Spanish Language, Organization of Ibero-American States and the United Nations.

History

Spanish conquest

Peru and Spain share a long history since the arrival of the first Spanish conquistadores led by Francisco Pizarro in 1532. In 1534, Pizarro succeeded in overcoming the Inca Empire (which stretched from present-day Ecuador, Peru, Bolivia, Chile, and Argentina) and claimed the territory for Spain. In 1535, Spain founded the city of Lima, which would become the seat of power and the capital of the Viceroyalty of Peru from 1542, and at its maximum expansion incorporated most of the nations of South America.

In the early 1780s, local highland indigenous peoples engaged in widespread uprisings, most notably the Rebellion of Tupac Amaru II, hoping to restore the Inca Empire. However, the revolts were defeated by Spanish troops.

Independence

Like many Latin-American nations in the early 19th century, Peru experienced a wave of awareness and possibility of independence from Spain. However, unlike most Latin American nations, Peru's independence was conducted primarily by outsiders. On 28 July 1821, José de San Martín declared the independence of Peru. It wouldn't be until December 1824 when the forces of Simón Bolívar entered Peru and the country fully obtained its independence.

Post Independence

In 1864, Peru, along with Bolivia, Chile, and Ecuador, declared war on Spain when Spanish forces occupied the Guano rich Chincha Islands just off the coast of Peru. The Chincha Islands War lasted until 1866 after the Battle of Callao when Spanish forces bombarded the port city and returned to Spain. In August 1879, Spain officially recognized the independence of Peru and representatives of both nations signed a Treaty of Peace and Friendship in Paris and therefore establishing diplomatic relations.

During the Spanish Civil War (1936-1939), the Peruvian embassy in Madrid was host to over 370 Spanish asylum seekers and Peruvian nationals trying to leave the country. Because the embassy was hosting Spanish nationals, government forces stationed soldiers at the entrance of the Peruvian embassy and consulate to ensure that they would capture any Spanish nationals trying to flee from the embassy. As a result, the Peruvian government issued a letter denouncing the government and their tactics. Due to the tense relationship between the two nations during this time period, Peru and Spain severed diplomatic relations in March 1938, however, once General Francisco Franco took power, both nations re-established diplomatic relations in February 1939. In June 1939, both nations re-opened their embassies in each other's capitals, respectively.

Over the years, both Peru and Spain have signed numerous agreements such as: agreements on air transport and trade relations (1954); agreement on dual citizenship (1959); social security agreement (1964) and cultural cooperation (1967).

In November 1978, Spanish King Juan Carlos I paid an official visit to Peru, his first to the country. Since then, members of the Spanish royal family and government officials would visit Peru on numerous occasions. In 1991, Peruvian President, Alberto Fujimori, paid an official state visit to Spain, the first by a Peruvian head of state.

In May 2018, Peru promoted the bilateral relationship with Spain. In November of the same year, the Spanish Kings, Felipe VI and Letizia Ortiz, met with the Peruvian President, Martín Vizcarra, and his wife, Maribel Díaz, beginning a state visit in which both countries strengthened their relations with a full schedule of contacts institutional, economic, social, defense and cultural. Both leaders expressed the desire to try a joint rapprochement in relations between the two countries. The Spanish king received from the hands of the head of state the medal of Order of Merit for Distinguished Services in the degree of Special Grand Cross. Likewise, Vizcarra affirmed Spanish support for Peru's accession to the OECD.

In 2021, the Peruvian president, Pedro Castillo, criticized the Spanish presence in Peru at his inauguration. Although an opposition deputy of the Congress of Peru, Carlos Lizarzaburu, sent a letter apologizing to King Felipe VI for the president's insults during his inauguration, criticizing the Peruvian president for his profound ignorance of the history that unites both nations and the existing relations between mutual support dating back two centuries. In 2022, Spain condemned the "rupture of the constitutional order" caused by Castillo in Peru. On the other hand, Spain congratulated the subsequent "restoration of democratic normality" after the Peruvian Congress approved, in extraordinary session, a motion of censure against Castillo for moral incapacity. Later, in January 2023, Spain asked to resolve the Peruvian political crisis through "constitutional channels".

Cultural cooperation
Peru hosts a Spanish Cultural Center in Lima. In October 2021, the start of the file for twinning was established between the cities of Córdoba (Spain) and Cusco (Peru), based on to the relationship as part of the World Heritage and also united by the figure of Inca Garcilaso de la Vega, promoting collaboration and the exchange of experiences in areas such as education, tourism, culture or economy, for the benefit of all its citizens.

In July 2022, the Peruvian ambassador to Spain, Óscar Maúrtua, announced that the Peruvian embassy is working on the opening of a "Peru House" in Madrid, as well as the construction of a replica of the "Chavín Stele" in Chamartín district. Likewise, the Peruvian consul in Madrid, Elizabeth González, stressed that relations between the two countries "have always been very good" and that they "continue to be", both because of the historical elements that unite both countries, and because of the cultural richness. Subsequently, Maúrtua argued that Spain and Peru are united by strong historical-cultural ties, developed over five centuries of shared traditions: architecture, painting, literature or gastronomy, under the richness of the Spanish language, and that both countries are recognized as strategic allies for the future. In addition, on the occasion of the 201 years of independence of the South American country, the Peruvian Foreign Minister, César Landa, stated that Peru recognizes Spain as the main "strategic and reliable ally" in the EU, highlighting the strong historical-cultural ties and the "excellent" economic relationship.

Trade
In 2017, trade between both Peru and Spain totaled €3 billion Euros. Peru's main exports to Spain include: copper, zinc, frozen crustaceans and sea mussels, fruits and vegetables. Spain main exports to Peru include: machinery, electrical equipment, construction machinery equipment and steel. Spanish multinational companies such as Banco Bilbao Vizcaya Argentaria, Banco Santander, Mapfre, Telefónica, and Zara operate in Peru. In 2011, Peru signed a free trade agreement with the EU (which includes Spain).

Transportation
There are direct flights between both nations with the following airlines: Air Europa, Iberia, LATAM Perú, and Plus Ultra Líneas Aéreas.

Resident diplomatic missions 
 Peru has an embassy in Madrid and consulates-general in Barcelona, Bilbao, Seville and Valencia.
 Spain has an embassy in Lima.

See also
 Peruvians in Spain
 Spanish immigration to Peru
 List of ambassadors of Peru to Spain

References

 
Spain
Peru
Relations of colonizer and former colony